, also known as , was the fourth shōgun of the Kamakura shogunate of Japan. His father was kanpaku Kujō Michiie and his grandmother was a niece of Minamoto no Yoritomo. His wife was a granddaughter of Minamoto no Yoritomo and daughter of Minamoto no Yoriie. He was born in the year (according to Chinese astrology) of the Tiger, in the month, on the day, and so his given name at birth was Mitora (三寅, "Triple Tiger").

Yoritsune was a member of the great Fujiwara clan. The Kujō family was one of the five branches of the historically powerful Fujiwara clan of courtiers.

Family 
 Father: Kujō Michiie
 Mother: Saionji Rinko
 Wife: Minamoto no Yoshiko (1202–1234)
 Concubine: Omiya no Tsubone
 Children:
 Kujō Yoritsugu by Omiya
 Kujō Michijo by Omiya
 Minamoto no Meguhime by Omiya

Events of Yoritsune's bakufu 
At the age of seven, in 1226, Yoritsune became Sei-i Taishōgun in a political deal between his father and the Kamakura shogunate regent Hōjō Yoshitoki and Hōjō Masako who set him up as a puppet shogun.

 1225 (Karoku 1, 11th month): At Kamakura, Yoritsune's coming of age ceremonies took place at age 8; but control of all bakufu affairs remained entirely in the hands of Hōjō Yasutoki, the regent (shikken).
 1226 (Karoku 2, 1st month): Emperor Go-Horikawa raised Yoritsune to the first rank of the fifth class in the apex of artistocratic court hierarchy (the dōjō kuge).
 1230 (Kangi 2, 12th month): Yoritsune is married to the daughter of Minamoto no Yoriie. She is 15 years older than he is.
 1231 (Kangi 3, 2nd month): Yoritsune is raised to the second rank of the 4th class in the dōjō kuge.
 1231 (Kangi 3, 3rd month): Yoritsune is created a general of the left.
 1231 (Kangi 3, 4th month): Yoritsune is raised to the first rank of the 4th class in the dōjō kuge.
 1232 (Jōei 1, 2nd month): Yoritsune is raised to the second rank of the 3rd class in the dōjō kuge.
 1233 (Tenpuku 1, 1st month): Yoritsune is granted the court post of provisional 
 1234 (Bunryaku 1, 12th month): Yoritsune is raised to the first rank of the 3rd class in the dōjō kuge.
 1235 (Katei 1, 11th month): Yoritsune is raised to the second rank of the second class in the dōjō kuge.
 1236 (Katei 2, 7th month): Yoritsune is raised to the first rank of the second class in the dōjō kuge.
 1237 (Katei 3, 8th month): Yoritsune ordered the building of a mansion in the Rokuhara section of Miyako.
 1238 (Ryakunin 1, 1st month): Yoritsune leaves Kamakura en route to Miyako, accompanied by Yaskutoki and the troupes of several provinces. Fujiwara no Yukimitis stays at Kamakura to preserve order in the land.
 1238 (Ryakunin 1, 2nd month): Yoritsune arrives in Miyako and begins to live in his new palace at Rokuhara.
 1238 (Ryakunin 1, 10th month): Yoritsune leaves Miyako to return to Kamakura.
 July 14, 1242 (Ninji 3, 15th day of the 6th month): Hōjō Yasutoki died at age 60. From Gennin 1, or during 19 years, Yasutoki had been the regent or prime minister (shikken) of the Kamakura shogunate. Yasutoki's son, Hōjō Tsunetoki succeeded him as shikken, but Yoritsune himself took charge of the bakufu.
 1244 (Kangen 2): In the spring of this year, a number of extraordinary phenomena in the skies over Kamakura troubled Yoritsune deeply.
 1244 (Kangen 2, 4th month): Yoritsune's son, Yoritsugu, had his coming-of-age ceremonies at age 6. In the same month, Yoritsune asked Emperor Go-Saga for permission to give up his responsibilities as shogun in favor of his son, Kujō Yoritsugu.
 September 11, 1245 (Kangen 3, 7th month): Yoshitsune shaved his head and became a Buddhist priest.
 1246 (Kangen 4, 7th month): Yoritsune's son, now Shogun Yoritsugu (who is only 7 years old) marries the sister of Hōjō Tsunetoki (who is himself only 16 years old).
 September 1, 1256 (Kōgen 1, 11th day of the 8th month): Kujō Yoritsune, also known as Fujiwara Yoritsune, died at the age of 39 years.
 October 14, 1256 (Kōgen 1, 24th day of the 9th month): Yoritsune's son and successor as Kamakura shogun, Kujō Yoritsugu, also known as Fujiwara Yoritsugu, died at the age of 18 years.

Eras of Yoritsune's bakufu 
The years in which Yoritsune was shogun are more specifically identified by more than one era name or nengō.
 Karoku   (1225–1227)
 Antei    (1227–1229)
 Kangi    (1229–1232)
 Jōei     (1232–1233)
 Tenpuku  (1233–1234)
 Bunryaku (1234–1235)
 Katei    (1235–1238)
 Ryakunin (1238–1239)
 En'ō     (1239–1240)
 Ninji    (1240–1243)
 Kangen   (1243–1247)

Notes

References 
 Mass, Jeffrey P. (1976). The Kamakura bakufu: a study in documents. Stanford: Stanford University Press.
 __. (1974). Warrior government in early medieval Japan: a study of the Kamakura Bakufu, shugo and jitō New Haven: Yale University Press.
 Nussbaum, Louis-Frédéric and Käthe Roth. (2005).  Japan encyclopedia. Cambridge: Harvard University Press. ;  OCLC 58053128
 Ōyama Kyōhei. Kamakura bakufu 鎌倉幕府. Tokyo: Shōgakkan 小学館, 1974.
 Titsingh, Isaac. (1834). Nihon Ōdai Ichiran; ou,  Annales des empereurs du Japon.  Paris: Royal Asiatic Society, Oriental Translation Fund of Great Britain and Ireland. OCLC 5850691.
 Varley, H. Paul. (1980). A Chronicle of Gods and Sovereigns: Jinnō Shōtōki of Kitabatake Chikafusa. New York: Columbia University Press.  ;  OCLC 6042764

1218 births
1256 deaths
13th-century Japanese people
13th-century shōguns
Kamakura shōguns
People of Kamakura-period Japan
Fujiwara clan
People from Kyoto